Selenda is a village in Bhatar CD block in Bardhaman Sadar North subdivision of Purba Bardhaman district in the state of West Bengal, India.

History
Census 2011 Selenda Village Location Code or Village Code 319840. The village of Selenda is located in the Bhatar tehsil of Burdwan district in West Bengal, India.

Demographics
The total geographic area of village is 322.29  hectares. Selenda features a total population of 2,053 peoples. There are about 428 houses in Selenda village. Ratanpur is nearest Village to Kumarun which is approximately 2 km away.

Caste
Selenda village of Barddhaman has substantial population of Schedule Caste. Schedule Caste (SC) constitutes 28.25% while Schedule Tribe (ST) were 6.82% of total population in Selenda village.

Population and house data

Transport 

Healthcare
Nearest Rural Hospital at Bhatar (with 60 beds) is the main medical facility in Bhatar CD block. There are primary health centres

External links
 Map
 Ratanpur

References 

Villages in Purba Bardhaman district